Habrocestum albopunctatum is a jumping spider species that lives on the Socotra Archipelago off the coast of the Yemen. It was first described in 2002.

References

Fauna of Socotra
Salticidae
Spiders described in 2002
Spiders of Asia
Taxa named by Wanda Wesołowska